There are a number of Elementary schools named Harvey Elementary School:

 Harvey Elementary School (Santa Ana, California)
 Harvey Elementary School (Ronan, Montana)
 Harvey Elementary School - (Harvey Station, New Brunswick)
 Harvey Elementary School (Kenosha, Wisconsin)